Pustulipora is a genus of fungi within the Ceratostomataceae family. This is a monotypic genus, containing the single species Pustulipora corticola.

References

External links
Pustulipora at Index Fungorum

Melanosporales
Monotypic Sordariomycetes genera